Arto Aas (born 9 June 1980) is an Estonian politician who was the Minister of Public Administration from 2015 to 2016.

On 9 April 2015, Aas became the Minister of Public Administration in Taavi Rõivas' second cabinet.

References

External links
Official website
Arto Aas at the Government of Estonia official website

1980 births
Government ministers of Estonia
Estonian Reform Party politicians
Living people
Politicians from Tallinn
Tallinn University of Technology alumni
21st-century Estonian politicians
Members of the Riigikogu, 2019–2023
Members of the Riigikogu, 2015–2019
Members of the Riigikogu, 2011–2015